Ari Saarinen (born November 26, 1967) is a Finnish former professional ice hockey left winger.

Saarinen played a total of 320 games in the SM-liiga for Ässät and SaiPa between 1993 and 1999. He also played in the Élite Ligue for Anglet Hormadi Élite in the 1999-00 season and the Austrian Hockey League for EHC Lustenau from 2000 to 2002.

References

External links

1967 births
Living people
Anglet Hormadi Élite players
Ässät players
Finnish ice hockey left wingers
Imatran Ketterä players
KooKoo players
EHC Lustenau players
People from Imatra
SaiPa players
SaPKo players
Sportspeople from South Karelia